Robinson Thornton (1824–1906) was Archdeacon of Middlesex from 1893  until 1903.

He was educated at Merchant Taylors' and St John's College, Oxford. He joined the staff of St John's, was ordained in 1852 and served a curacy at St Thomas', Oxford. He was the first headmaster of Epsom College and then Warden of Trinity College, Glenalmond. In 1878 he became Vicar of St John, Notting Hill;  and in 1889 a prebendary of St Paul's.

He died on 15 August 1906: his brother was the first Bishop of Ballarat.

Notes

1824 births
People educated at Merchant Taylors' School, Northwood
Alumni of St John's College, Oxford
Archdeacons of Middlesex
1906 deaths
Headmasters of Epsom College